Albert Charles Cadieu (28 June 1903 – 31 October 1990) is a Canadian former politician. A member of the Progressive Conservative party, he represented the electoral district of Meadow Lake in the House of Commons of Canada from 1958 to 1972, and again from 1974 to 1979. He was a member of many standing committees throughout his parliamentary career, including Agriculture; Fisheries; Indian Affairs and Northern Development; Mines, Forests and Water; and Transport and Communications.

Archives 
There is an Albert Cadieu fonds at Library and Archives Canada. Archival reference number is R5489.

References

External links
 

1903 births
1990 deaths
Progressive Conservative Party of Canada MPs
Members of the House of Commons of Canada from Saskatchewan